Charles Toole may refer to:

 Charles Toole (American football) (1922-2008), American football coach
 Charles Toole (cricketer) (born 1939), English cricketer